Steven Miles may refer to:
Steven H. Miles, American medical doctor and author
Steven Miles (politician) (born 1977), Australian politician

See also
Stephen Miles (disambiguation)